Gleba cordata is a species of sea butterfly, a floating and swimming sea snail or sea slug, a pelagic marine gastropod mollusk in the family Cymbuliidae.

References

Cymbuliidae
Gastropods described in 1776
Taxa named by Carsten Niebuhr